Natalya Petrova (née Kokulenko; born 16 November 1957) is a Russian female former track and field hurdler who competed for the Soviet Union in the 100 metres hurdles. She represented her country at the 1983 World Championships in Athletics and the 1982 European Athletics Indoor Championships, finishing fourth on both occasions. She was the gold medallist in the sprint hurdles at the 1983 Universiade.

She was a one-time national champion, having won the 60 metres hurdles at the 1982 Soviet Indoor Championships. She achieved her personal best at the World Championships in 1983, running a time of 12.83 seconds in qualifying.

International competitions

National titles
Soviet Indoor Athletics Championships
60 m hurdles: 1982

References

Living people
1957 births
Russian female hurdlers
Soviet female hurdlers
World Athletics Championships athletes for the Soviet Union
Universiade medalists in athletics (track and field)
Universiade gold medalists for the Soviet Union
Medalists at the 1983 Summer Universiade